Ak Bars may refer to:
 Aq Bars (or Ak Bars), the emblem of Tatarstan.
 Ak Bars Kazan, a Russian professional ice hockey team based in Kazan.
 Ak Bars Holding, a Russian financial holding.